Phelps Town Hall is a historic town hall located at Phelps in Ontario County, New York. It was built in 1849 and remodeled in 1912–1913.  It is architecturally significant as a Greek Revival style town hall with distinguished Neoclassical style modifications.  It features an elegant clock tower with paired, fluted Corinthian columns.

It was listed on the National Register of Historic Places in 1996.

References

External links
Town of Phelps NY | Home of the Sauerkraut Festival

City and town halls on the National Register of Historic Places in New York (state)
Neoclassical architecture in New York (state)
Government buildings completed in 1849
Phelps, New York
Buildings and structures in Ontario County, New York
1849 establishments in New York (state)
National Register of Historic Places in Ontario County, New York